Digi Sport is a Romanian sports television that was launched on 23 July 2009, available only on the Digi TV platform. It is offered as a set of sports channels, called Digi Sport 1, Digi Sport 2, Digi Sport 3 and Digi Sport 4. On 23 November 2018 Digi 4K was launched just for main events.

Genre 
Digi Sport is one of the sports television in Romania. There are a variety of sports competitions such as football, tennis, handball, basketball, volleyball or kickboxing. Digi Sport is also one of the broadcasters of Formula 1 for Romania.

Football

Liga 1 
Digi Sport will show 270 live Liga 1 matches from 2019 to 2024. These games are played on Friday nights, Saturday and Sunday evenings and nights and Monday nights. Before the game, at half-time and after the game all Liga 1 games have dedicated programmes including Fotbal Club and Digi Sport Special presented by Radu Naum and Valentin Moraru and with special guests like Gabi Balint, Ilie Dumitrescu, Helmuth Duckadam, Florin Bratu, Claudiu Niculescu or Ionel Danciulescu.

La Liga 
Since 2009 Digi Sport has the rights to broadcast every game in the competition. Digi Sport airs all 380 games of the La Liga season including El Clasico. The biggest games are preceded by the talk show named Fotbal European presented by George Dobre and with some special guests including Andrei Niculescu, Gabi Balint and Nana Falemi.

Kickboxing

Colosseum Tournament 
Since 2016 Digi Sport has the rights to broadcast every event in the Colosseum Tournament and its Prometheus Fighting Promotion brand.

References

External links

Television stations in Romania
Television channels and stations established in 2009
Sports television in Romania